Kaatje bij de Sluis is a restaurant located in Blokzijl, Netherlands. It is a fine dining restaurant awarded one or two Michelin stars from 1978 until the present time, with the exception of 2005. GaultMillau awarded them 16.0 points (out of 20).

The predecessor of head chef Peter Postma was André Mol, who was responsible for the two Michelin star rating.

Kaatje bij de Sluis is a member of Alliance Gastronomique Néerlandaise.

The restaurant is located in the centre of Blokzijl, a small but old town, near the sluices. The name points to the legend of "Kaatje", a girl who at a young age assumed leadership over the kitchen of the inn "In den Gouden Walvisch".

Star history
- 1978-1991: one star
- 1992-2002: two stars
- 2003-2004: one star
- 2005: no stars (due to change of chef)
- 2006–present: one star

Head chefs 
- Edzart Delstra: 1979-1986
- André Mol ...-2007 
- Peter Postma: 2007–present

See also
List of Michelin starred restaurants in the Netherlands

Sources and references 

Restaurants in the Netherlands
Michelin Guide starred restaurants in the Netherlands